Selivanovsky District is an administrative and municipal district (raion), one of the sixteen in Vladimir Oblast, Russia. It is located in the east of the oblast. Its administrative center is the urban locality (a settlement) of Krasnaya Gorbatka. Population:   21,330 (2002 Census);  The population of Krasnaya Gorbatka accounts for 46.5% of the district's total population.

References

Notes

Sources

Districts of Vladimir Oblast